Deluna, DeLuna, or de Luna may refer to:
 Álvaro de Luna (c. 1389–1453), Spanish politician
 Carlos DeLuna (1962–1989), executed (Texas, USA) after controversial conviction
 Jeff de Luna (born 1984), Filipino pool player
 Kat DeLuna, American pop/R&B singer
 Marisol Deluna, American fashion designer
 Pedro de Luna (1328–1423), Avignon Pope Benedict XIII
 Tristán de Luna y Arellano (1519–1571), Spanish Conquistador

Translated from Spanish to English, "De" means "Of" and "Luna" means "Moon".

References